Mika Singh (born 10 June 1977) is an Indian singer. His songs include "Bas Ek King" (Singh Is Kinng), "Mauja Hi Mauja" (Jab We Met), "Ibn-e-Batuta" (Ishqiya), and "Dhanno" (Housefull). He has released several solo albums and appeared on reality shows. His song "Sawan Main Lag Gayi Aag" was remixed by U.S based singer Pinky Paras.

Early life 
Singh was born on 10 June 1977 as Amrik Singh in Durgapur, West Bengal. He is the youngest of six brothers. Singh and his elder brother Daler Mehndi were inspired by their father, Ajmer Singh, a trained classical musician who used to sing kirtans in Patna Sahib Gurdwara since childhood.

Concerts and tours
In 2014, Singh performed live and sold out in Bollywood Showstoppers at The O2 Arena with Arjun Kapoor, Sonakshi Sinha, Jacqueline Fernandez, Shahid Kapoor, Ali Zafar, and supported by Bollywood dance group Bolly Flex, that appeared Sky1's dance competition show, Got to Dance.

Singh also performed at his biggest outdoor concert at Danny Singh's Sandwell & Birmingham Mela in 2016 with an overall audience for the duration of the Mela estimated to be 80,000.

Legal issues
Rakhi Sawant filed case against Mika for forcibly kissing her on 11 June 2006.

In 2018 Singh was arrested in UAE after a case was filed against him by a Brazilian teenager model for allegedly sexually assaulting her. After this, he was sent to jail and later on released after the intervention of the Indian Embassy.

All India Cine Workers Association (AICWA) on 14 August 2019 banned singer Mika Singh from the Indian film industry for performing at an event in Karachi, Pakistan. The event in Pakistan was organised by former Pakistani president Pervez Musharraf's close relative. The film body further put an unconditional ban on the singer and boycotted him from all the movies and music contracts with the entertainment companies. The association also sought the intervention of Information and Broadcasting ministry in the matter.

Discography

Film soundtracks

Solo albums

Filmography

References

External links
 
 
 

Living people
1977 births
Male actors from Patna
People from Bihar
People from Durgapur, West Bengal
Bengali singers
Male actors from West Bengal
Indian Sikhs
Indian male playback singers
Indian male voice actors
Kannada playback singers
Performers of Sikh music
Indian folk-pop singers
Bhangra (music) musicians
Indian rappers
Singers from West Bengal
21st-century Indian male singers
21st-century Indian singers